Natalya Sergeyevna Donchenko (25 August 1932 – 11 July 2022) was the first female Soviet speed skater to win an Olympic medal. She had taught herself to skate on an abandoned rink during world war two. She was spotted and asked to join a skating team. She said her most proud moment was to win in 1945 but her Olympic Siver medal in California was her greatest achievement.

Life
Donchenko was vrought up in Gorky after her father was arrested when she was a child and they never saw him again. During the war she was living by an ice rivk and the fencing was taken down to be used elsewhere and she and others played on the ice while the athletes raced past them. The athletes noticed her skills and asked her to join them. In 1945 she competed and won for the first time. She remembered this as her biggest triumph.

In 1952 she won the USSR 500m speed skating race at the Medeu ice rink near Alma-Ata in Kazakhstan while she was a student at the Gorky Institute of Foreign Languages. She became a French teacher. In 1957 she married her trainer and quickly had a daughter. She retrained and by January 1958 she was back in the team.

When she competed at the Olympics in "Squaw Valley" in California her husband had to stay at home. He was surprised that she lost the gold medal by only a tenth of a second but he knew her achievement was outstanding. Later he realised that they could have made more of her victory but they were not aware of what might have been done. She did compete in the 1960 World Championship and she was placed fourth.

References

Personal records

Olympic results

External links
 skateresults
 sports-reference
 Getty Images
 International Olympic Committee
 Speed Skating Statistics
 USSR Information Bulletin. Soviet skaters set new world records. B. Sokolov February, 25 1952

1932 births
2022 deaths
Soviet female speed skaters
Olympic speed skaters of the Soviet Union
Speed skaters at the 1960 Winter Olympics
Olympic silver medalists for the Soviet Union
Olympic medalists in speed skating
Russian female speed skaters
Medalists at the 1960 Winter Olympics
Speed skaters from Moscow